John Early may refer to:

John Early (educator) (1814–1873), Irish-American Jesuit educator
John Early (politician) (1828–1877), Lieutenant Governor of Illinois
John Early (bishop) (1786–1873), American Methodist prelate
John Early (comedian) (born 1988), American comedian and actor

See also
John Earle (disambiguation)